With Hoops of Steel is a 1918 American silent Western film directed by Eliot Howe and starring Henry B. Walthall, William De Vaull and Mary Charleson.

Cast
 Henry B. Walthall as Emerson Mead
 William De Vaull as Jim Harlin
 Mary Charleson as Marguerite Delance
 Joseph J. Dowling as Col. Whittaker
 Howard Crampton as Pierre Delarue
 Roy Laidlaw as Albert Wellesley
 Jack Standing as Paul Delarue
 Clifford Alexander as Will Whittaker
 Anna Mae Walthall as Amanda Garcia

References

Bibliography
 Gmür, Leonhard, Rex Ingram: Hollywood's Rebel of the Silver Screen. 2013.

External links
 

1918 films
1918 Western (genre) films
1910s English-language films
American black-and-white films
Films directed by Eliot Howe
Films distributed by W. W. Hodkinson Corporation
Silent American Western (genre) films
1910s American films